William Birchinshaw (fl. 1584-1617) was a Welsh poet believed to be from the Denbighshire area. Morris Kyffin was one of his contemporaries. References are made to him in a letter by William Myddelton, who describes him as a 'wandering minstrel'.

References 

Welsh poets
Year of birth unknown
Year of death unknown